Seadog or sea dog may refer to:

 a sailor (slang)
 a dog at sea (slang)
 pinnipeds (seals), as in:
 a member of the Portland Sea Dogs baseball team
 a member of the Saint John Sea Dogs hockey team
 Sea Dog Brewing Company, a manufacturer of beer and a chain of restaurants
 "Seadog", an episode from the first season of the American television drama series NCIS
 a supporter of the defunct Scarborough F.C. or phoenix club Scarborough Athletic F.C.
 a mariner's term for a fog bow, an optical phenomenon
 the fictional species of Raymond, the mascot for the Tampa Bay Rays
 an antiquated term for a shark
 Sea Dog, a pseudonym used at one point in Wong Sun v. United States, 371 U.S. 471 (1963)
 Seadog 30 originally a shallow long keel yacht with twin bilge keels that contain within them the water tanks (a later deeper longkeel design was made) - designed by Reg Freeman in the 1960's to be made in GRP.
 HMS Seadog, a British WW2-era S-class submarine.

See also 

 Sea Dogs (disambiguation)